The Koreng, also spelled Goreng, are an indigenous Noongar people of south-west of Western Australia.

Language
Koreng belonged to the Nyungic language family, and, specifically, the Koreng appear to have spoken the Wilmun dialect of Nyungar.

Country
Their neighbouring tribes were the Wiilman to the north, the Njakinjaki, northeast by north, the Mineng, directly south, the Wiilman to the north, the Pibelmen in the southwest, and the Kaneang on their western flank.

History of contact
Koreng lands began to be expropriated in 1859, at a time when white settlers estimated their numbers to be about 500. Within a little over two decades, these had been reduced to 200 (1880).

Burial rites
The knees are bent up and then bound, with the right hand forefinger and thumb, the latter's nail having previously been burnt off, tied in a ligature. The purpose of this nail burning and bondage is to ensure that the dead person will not dig his way out of his grave, and, returning, be capable of wielding his spears. The overburden of earth dug out to excavate the burial site must not be used to fill the grave, which is otherwise covered with bark, rushes and sticks. A fire is then kindled, his worldly goods, including his broken spears, are then laid nearby, and trees are scarred with rings to mark the site.

Mythology
A considerable amount of information concerning Koreng mythology was written down in the 1880s by Edith Hassell, wife of Albert Young Hassell. The manuscript was neglected until it was turned up by the visiting American anthropologist Daniel Sutherland Davidson in 1930. Davidson edited the material for the English journal Folklore over 1934–1935, and this remains an important resource for reconstructing Koreng traditions.

Native title
The Wagyl Kaip and Southern Noongar claim for Native Title was made in September 2006.

Alternative names
 Ko:rengi
 Kuriny, Corine
 Cororan
 Bremer Bay tribe
 Warangu, Warrangoo
 Warranger, Warrangle
 Kojonup
 Stirling tribe
 Mongup
 Kokar (east)
 Kaialiwongi (kaiali = north, Minang people name for their language)

Some words
 mam (father)
 ngangk (mother)
 twurt (tame dog)
 moakin (wild dog)
 nyituing (whiteman)
 nawp (baby)

Notes

Citations

Sources

Great Southern (Western Australia)
Noongar